Robert Fowler (5 December 1931 – 27 December 2001) was a South African cyclist. He competed at the 1952, 1956 and 1960 Summer Olympics. At the 1952 Olympics, he won a silver medal in the 4,000 metres team pursuit event.

References

External links
 
 

1931 births
2001 deaths
South African male cyclists
Olympic cyclists of South Africa
Cyclists at the 1952 Summer Olympics
Cyclists at the 1956 Summer Olympics
Cyclists at the 1960 Summer Olympics
Medalists at the 1952 Summer Olympics
Olympic silver medalists for South Africa
Olympic medalists in cycling
Cyclists at the 1954 British Empire and Commonwealth Games
Commonwealth Games bronze medallists for South Africa
People from Krugersdorp
Commonwealth Games medallists in cycling
Sportspeople from Gauteng
20th-century South African people
21st-century South African people
Medallists at the 1954 British Empire and Commonwealth Games